Marklovice was a village in Cieszyn Silesia. After division of that area between Czechoslovakia and Poland in 1920, it was divided between these two countries.
 Dolní Marklovice, a village in the Czech Republic
 Marklowice Górne, a village in Poland